The Midnight Man is a 1919 American film serial directed by James W. Horne. It is now considered to be a lost film.

Plot
As described in a film magazine, Bob Gilmore (Corbett), a young Washington clubman, pleads guilty to his foster father's forgery and becomes a fugitive from justice. As he is about to leave, he learns that his supposed parents adopted him from a foundling society. His only clue to his identity is some baby clothing and a ring. While escaping from the city, he is set upon by the White Circle gang of thieves who throw him in front of a train. He miraculously escapes from death and reaches New York City. While robbing a barroom, one of the thieves is killed and the police, finding Gilmore's jewelry on the body, believe that he is dead. Gilmore then takes the name Stevens and breaks into the homes of the wealthy at midnight in an attempt to learn his identity. At each place he takes nothing of value but leaves an impression of his ring in an effort to trace his parents. He has occasion to rescue a pretty young woman from thugs and finds she is the daughter of a wealthy man named Morgan. Morgan (Girard), it develops, is the leader of the White Circle gang. Gilmore is also being followed by a mysterious Hindu, and is being tracked by Detective Arnold (Singleton). Gilmore in the episodes is frequently called upon to display his boxing abilities in rough and tumble fights, and often takes daring athletic feats during his quest to discover his identity.

Cast
 James J. Corbett as Bob Gilmore
Kathleen O'Connor as Nell
 Joseph W. Girard as Morgan
 Frank Jonasson as John Gilmore
 Joseph Singleton as Detective Arnold
 Orrall Humphrey as Ramah
 Georgia Woodthorpe as Martha
 William Sauter as Hargreaves
 Noble Johnson as Spike
 Sam Polo
 Montgomery Carlyle
 Ann Forrest

List of episodes
 Cast Adrift 
 Deadly Enemies 
 Ten Thousand Dollars Reward 
 At Bay 
 Unmasked 
 The Elevator Mystery 
 The Electric Foe 
 Shadow of Fear 
 The Society Hold-Up 
 The Blazing Torch 
 The Death Ride 
 The Tunnel of Terror 
 A Fight to the Finish 
 The Jaws of Death 
 The Wheel of Terror 
 Hurled From the Heights
 The Cave of Destruction 
 A Wild Finish

See also
 List of film serials
 List of film serials by studio
 List of lost films

References

External links

1919 films
1919 lost films
American silent serial films
American black-and-white films
Universal Pictures film serials
Films directed by James W. Horne
Lost American films
1910s American films